Pseudaletis, commonly known as fantasies, is a genus of butterflies in the family Lycaenidae. The species of this genus are found in the Afrotropical realm.

Species
Pseudaletis abriana Libert, 2007
Pseudaletis agrippina H. H. Druce, 1888
Pseudaletis antimachus (Staudinger, 1888)
Pseudaletis arrhon H. H. Druce, 1913
Pseudaletis batesi H. H. Druce, 1910
Pseudaletis bouyeri Collins & Libert, 2007
Pseudaletis busoga van Someren, 1939
Pseudaletis camarensis Collins & Libert, 2007
Pseudaletis catori Bethune-Baker, 1926
Pseudaletis clymenus (H. H. Druce, 1885)
Pseudaletis cornesi Collins & Libert, 2007
Pseudaletis dolieri Collins & Libert, 2007
Pseudaletis ducarmei Libert, 2007
Pseudaletis jolyana Libert, 2007
Pseudaletis leonis (Staudinger, 1888)
Pseudaletis lusambo Stempffer, 1961
Pseudaletis malangi Collins & Larsen, 1995
Pseudaletis mazanguli Neave, 1910
Pseudaletis melissae Collins & Libert, 2007
Pseudaletis michelae Libert, 2007
Pseudaletis richardi Stempffer, 1952
Pseudaletis rileyi Libert, 2007
Pseudaletis taeniata Libert, 2007
Pseudaletis zebra Holland, 1891

References

External links
 

 
Lycaenidae genera
Taxa named by Hamilton Herbert Druce